William Arthur Klucas (July 8, 1941 – April 22, 2014) was an American college and professional basketball coach.  Klucas coached over 500 games in the Continental Basketball Association (CBA), coached professionally in Canada and Brazil, and was an assistant college coach at Ashland University, Ohio State University and the University of Minnesota.  He was also head coach for the University of Wisconsin–Milwaukee for two seasons. In 1980, Klucas was named CBA Coach of the Year and his Anchorage Northern Knights won the league championship.

References

1941 births
2014 deaths
American expatriate basketball people in Brazil
American expatriate basketball people in Canada
American men's basketball coaches
American men's basketball players
Ashland Eagles men's basketball coaches
Ashland Eagles men's basketball players
Basketball coaches from Ohio
Basketball players from Ohio
College men's basketball head coaches in the United States
Continental Basketball Association coaches
Continental Basketball Association executives
Milwaukee Panthers men's basketball coaches
Minnesota Golden Gophers men's basketball coaches
Ohio State Buckeyes men's basketball coaches
People from Ashland County, Ohio
People from Brownsville, Minnesota
Western Basketball Association coaches